Reckless is the second studio album by American country music artist Morgan Wade. It was released on March 19, 2021, through the Thirty Tigers label.

Release 
The track "Wilder Days" was released as a single and peaked at number 36 on the Billboard Hot Country Songs chart and number 29 on the Country Airplay chart.

On January 28, 2022, a deluxe edition of the album was released with six additional tracks. This re-release was done through Arista Nashville. One of the six bonus tracks is a cover of Elvis Presley's "Suspicious Minds".

Reception 

Slant Magazine critic Jim Malec stated that Wade "blends pop and country without subjugating either, all the while covering a wide swath of stylistic ground".

Track listing 

Deluxe edition bonus tracks

Chart performance

References 

2021 albums
Thirty Tigers albums
Morgan Wade (singer) albums